Most Annoying Person is a British television programme that was broadcast on BBC Three from 27 December 2006 to 26 December 2011, and was usually shown each year during the end of December. The show counted down the 100 "most irritating" people, with celebrities, pop stars, and politicians all in the running. It was narrated by Richard Bacon.

History
The show for 2008 was criticised in March 2009 for homophobic comments about Lindsay Lohan. The BBC Trust's Editorial Standards Committee condemned comments by DJ Spoony and Ron Jeremy, and demanded they be cut from future repeats. Agyness Deyn won that year.

Top Tens

Ratings
The show for 2011 got 776,000 viewers (3.1%) on 26 December 2011.

Transmissions

References

External links
 
 

BBC Television shows
2006 British television series debuts
2011 British television series endings
Lists of worsts